Personality Plus is an early novel by American author Edna Ferber.  Originally published in 1914, Personality Plus is the second of three volumes chronicling the travels and events in the life of Emma McChesney.  Ferber achieved her first successes with a series of stories centering on this character, a stylish and intelligent divorced mother who rises rapidly in business.

Sources
Personality Plus at Project Gutenberg

External links
 

1914 American novels
Novels by Edna Ferber